Creative Writer 2, known as Mon Atelier d'Écriture in French and Junior Schreibstudio in German, was a word processing program released in 1996 by Microsoft Kids. The interface was updated and the program was now designed for Windows 95.

New or changed features
 The menu has been rearranged, following a study carried out by Microsoft.
 The program ran in a window, ranging in size from 640x480 pixels to 1024x768 pixels, depending on the display resolution set on the computer.  It did not run in full screen.
 Microsoft's Paint It!, from their Plus for Kids pack, was included at no additional charge with Creative Writer 2.  Although it was a separate program, it could be used to edit any images double-clicked in a word processing document.
 Support for creating and publishing websites was also included through Microsoft's Web Publishing Wizard.
 Support for opening and saving in Rich Text Format (.rtf) files and text files (.txt).
 Nearly a dozen of themes based on nature and sports are included to customize the program's look and feel.  The demo only includes the ocean theme.

Removed features
 Imaginopolis
 Support for Microsoft Word (.doc) files.
 The McZee character, although he makes a cameo appearance as a font and in the clip art gallery.

Viewer
The Microsoft Creative Writer 2 Document Viewer was available free of charge.  It allows users without Creative Writer 2 to view, but not edit, .max files created with Creative Writer 2.

See also
Microsoft Home
Fine Artist
Creative Writer

References

External links
Creative Writer website (archived)
Creative Writer 2 Trial Version Download

Discontinued Microsoft software